Tadeusz Siwek (9 October 1935 – May 1997) was a Polish volleyball player. He competed in the men's tournament at the 1968 Summer Olympics.

References

1935 births
1997 deaths
Polish men's volleyball players
Olympic volleyball players of Poland
Volleyball players at the 1968 Summer Olympics
Sportspeople from Chorzów